Robert Kaleski (1877-1961) was a self-taught writer, bushman, environmentalist and canine authority living in New South Wales at the turn of the nineteenth century. While he is perhaps best known for his role in breeding and developing the first breed standard for the Australian Cattle Dog he also developed the first breed standard for the Australian Kelpie, wrote on a number of practical subjects for the newspapers of the time, and published works of fiction in magazines such as The Bulletin. In addition Kaleski patented his designs for improved farm implements, and developed and applied successful theories of soil management in times of drought.

A bachelor, he spent most of his life on his farm at Moorebank, where a street is now named in his honour. He died at the age of 84.

Early years
Robert Lucian Stanislaus Kaleski was the son of a Polish mining engineer, John Kaleski, and his English wife Isabel, née Falder. Political pressures in Poland led John Kaleski to move to Germany, where he held academic appointments at Bonn and Heidelberg Universities, and from there to Australia where he re-built a career as a mining engineer and assayer. Robert Kaleski was born on 19 January 1877 at Burwood in Sydney. Ill health as a child led to him spending long periods with a relative at Holsworthy, where he attended little school but learned much about the local bush.

In his teens, living in Sydney with access to a good library, he educated himself and began studying for a legal career, however he abandoned his studies at the age of twenty-one and went droving. He had a series of jobs in the bush including working on a property at Grenfell and timber getting on the Dorrigo Plateau before taking up a small selection at Holsworthy in 1904.

Dog expert

Kaleski became a dog owner at the age of six years, and was a lifelong student of the dog and the dingo. In 1893 he was a member of the Cattle Dog Club of Sydney, and one of a group of members who bred from bloodlines originating from Thomas Hall's "Hall's Heelers" and called their dogs the Australian Cattle Dog.

In 1903 he drew up the first breed standard for the Australian Cattle Dog, and in 1904 the first breed standard for the Kelpie and another variety of sheepdog he called the Barb, a breed which is now considered synonymous with the Kelpie. These standards were accepted by the leading breeders of the time, published  in The Agricultural Gazette of New South Wales, adopted by the Kennel Club of New South Wales, and became the guidelines for breeders and judges Australia-wide.

Kaleski founded the Cattle and Sheepdog Club of Australia. A dedicated breeder, he also worked his dogs with stock, and both exhibited and judged dogs in the show ring. With his dog Nugget (1908–12) he founded a noted line of Australian Cattle Dogs that included champions such as Clovelly Mavis and Clovelly Biddy.

Writer

Under a variety of pen names, including 'Falder' his mother's maiden name, Kaleski wrote a number of articles on bush life for the Sydney Mail, Sydney Morning Herald, and Worker, and short fiction for The Bulletin. His articles on dogs and other animals were also featured in A. G. Stephens's literary magazine called The Bookfellow. In association with the Royal Agricultural Society of NSW, the Forestry Commission of New South Wales, and the NSW Department of Agriculture he published articles on working dogs and settler life, and on the Australian bush.

He wrote The Australian settler's complete guide : scientific and practical published in 1909. Targeting British migrants,  it was "written for the man on the land and for intending settlers in New South Wales" and contained detailed information about all types of farming, and the equipment needed. In it Kaleski gave practical directions for such essential tasks as Building the Hut.
   
In 1914 his articles and stories on dogs were re-published in book form as Australian Barkers and Biters, with illustrations by Hugh Maclean. In 1933 he published a completely revised edition which embodied his theories on the origin of the dog, and which had photographs instead of illustrations. Another revised edition of Barkers and Biters was published posthumously in 1987.

Kaleski is mentioned in Dame Mary Gilmore's 1922 book of prose poems entitled Hound of the Road, "But who has written our dog? Kaleski? Kaleski wrote dogs, not the dog."

Kaleski's writings were based on his experiences. Sir Joseph Carruthers noted his keen powers of observation, likening him to the naturalist Jean Henri Fabre. Carruthers described Kaleski as an interesting conversationalist who wrote as he spoke, "with wit and brevity".

Bushman
Kaleski is described as a "true bushman and environmentalist". He was keenly interested in agriculture, inventing and patenting a number of new or improved farm implements and practical tools. He lived through the devastating  Federation Drought which reached its climax in late 1901 and 1902, and devised a water and soil management scheme to offset the effects of drought. In 1918 he bought a run-down farm at Moorebank, near Liverpool. He lived at Thorn Hill until his death, and continued to experiment with plant breeding and other agricultural developments.

Kaleski was a Fellow of the Linnean Society of New South Wales.

References 

Australian writers
Australian environmentalists
1877 births
1961 deaths